Mark Paterson may refer to:

 Mark Paterson (ice hockey) (born 1964), retired Canadian ice hockey player
 Mark Paterson (field hockey) (born 1985), Australian field hockey player
 Mark Paterson (public servant) (born 1954), senior Australian public servant
 Mark Paterson (sailor) (1947–2022), New Zealand sailor who competed at the 1976 Summer Olympics
 Mark Paterson (sound engineer), British sound engineer

See also
 Mark Patterson (disambiguation)
 Mark Pattison (disambiguation)